Rutul may refer to:
Rutul people, an ethnic group in the Republic of Dagestan, Russia
Rutul language, their Lezgic language
Rutul (rural locality), a rural locality (a selo) in the Republic of Dagestan, Russia

See also
Rutuli, members of the legendary Italic tribe
RU-TUL, ISO 3166-2:RU abbreviation for Tula Oblast, Russia